Vanessa Catherine Tyson is an American political scientist and politician. She is an associate professor of politics at Scripps College and a political science fellow at Stanford University. Tyson was an unsuccessful candidate for California's 57th State Assembly district in the 2020 election, finishing in fifth place with 8.6% of the vote in the nonpartisan primary.

Early life and education 
Tyson was raised in Whittier, California. She was the victim of childhood abuse. Tyson was voted "Most likely to succeed," as a senior at La Serna High School. She completed a bachelor of arts in politics and a certificate in African American studies at Princeton University in 1998. She was awarded the Ruth B. Simmons Thesis Prize and the 1998 Spirit of Princeton award. Tyson earned a master's degree and a doctor of philosophy in political science from University of Chicago. Her 2011 dissertation on marginalization and influence in the U.S. House of Representatives was the basis for her book Twists of Fate. Her doctoral advisors were Michael C. Dawson and Cathy J. Cohen.

Career 
Tyson was an assistant professor at Dickinson College in the Department of Political Science for about eight years, where she taught courses in American government, political representation, and marginalization of groups though racism, sexism, and homophobia. She left the institution in June 2015 and is currently an associate professor of politics at Scripps College. During the 2018-19 academic year, Tyson was a fellow at Stanford University Center for Advanced Study in the Behavioral Sciences.

In 2019, Tyson, a Democrat, announced her candidacy for the California State Assembly's 57th District. The 57th District includes Tyson's hometown of Whittier, California as well as Norwalk, Hacienda Heights, and La Puente. The incumbent, Ian Calderon, announced in November that he would not be seeking reelection. In her announcement, she stated that she would be focusing on environmental protection, affordable housing, poverty reduction, access to education, and advocacy for women's rights and sexual violence prevention. Five other Democrats and one Republican have also filed papers to replace Calderon, including Whittier City Councilmembers Josue Alvarado and Henry Bouchot.

Personal life 

In 2019, Tyson alleged that Justin Fairfax had sexually assaulted her in 2004 in his hotel room in Boston. Tyson was volunteering at a Boston rape crisis center at the time. He denied sexually assaulting her and said their encounter was consensual. She hired Katz, Marshall & Banks, the legal team that represented Christine Blasey Ford during the Brett Kavanaugh Supreme Court nomination.

Selected works

Books

References

External links
 

Living people
Center for Advanced Study in the Behavioral Sciences fellows
Princeton University alumni
University of Chicago alumni
Dickinson College faculty
Scripps College faculty
20th-century American women scientists
21st-century American women politicians
21st-century American politicians
American women political scientists
American political scientists
American women social scientists
African-American political scientists
21st-century American women scientists
20th-century social scientists
21st-century social scientists
Scientists from California
African-American women in politics
20th-century African-American scientists
21st-century African-American scientists
People from Whittier, California
Year of birth missing (living people)
California Democrats
Women in California politics
Politicians from Greater Los Angeles
African-American people in California politics
Candidates in the 2020 United States elections
20th-century African-American women
21st-century African-American women